Ramon Dean Andersson (born 20 March 1963) is an Australian sprint and marathon canoeist who competed in the 1990s. Competing in two Summer Olympics, he won a bronze medal in the K-4 1000 m event at Barcelona in 1992.

Andersson also won a silver medal in the K-4 10000 m event at the 1991 ICF Canoe Sprint World Championships in Paris. He was an Australian Institute of Sport sprint canoeing scholarship holder in 1989–1993 and 1995.

On 29 September 2000, he was awarded the Australian Sports Medal for his canoeing achievements.

References

External links
 
 
 

1963 births
Living people
Australian male canoeists
Olympic canoeists of Australia
Olympic bronze medalists for Australia
Olympic medalists in canoeing
Canoeists at the 1992 Summer Olympics
Medalists at the 1992 Summer Olympics
Canoeists at the 1996 Summer Olympics
ICF Canoe Sprint World Championships medalists in kayak
Medalists at the ICF Canoe Marathon World Championships
Australian Institute of Sport canoeists
Recipients of the Australian Sports Medal
20th-century Australian people